Red Hat Linux was a widely used commercial open-source Linux distribution created by Red Hat until its discontinuation in 2004.

Early releases of Red Hat Linux were called Red Hat Commercial Linux. Red Hat published the first non-beta release in May 1995. It was the first Linux distribution to use the RPM Package Manager as its packaging format, and over time has served as the starting point for several other distributions, such as Mandriva Linux and Yellow Dog Linux.

In 2003, Red Hat discontinued the Red Hat Linux line in favor of Red Hat Enterprise Linux (RHEL) for enterprise environments. Fedora Linux, developed by the community-supported Fedora Project and sponsored by Red Hat, is a free-of-cost alternative intended for home use. Red Hat Linux 9, the final release, hit its official end-of-life on April 30, 2004, although updates were published for it through 2006 by the Fedora Legacy project until the updates were discontinued in early 2007.

Features
Version 3.0.3 was one of the first Linux distributions to support ELF (Executable and Linkable Format) binaries instead of the older a.out format. 

Red Hat Linux introduced a graphical installer called Anaconda developed by Ketan Bagal, intended to be easy to use for novices, and which has since been adopted by some other Linux distributions. It also introduced a built-in tool called Lokkit for configuring the firewall capabilities.

In version 6 Red Hat moved to glibc 2.1, egcs-1.2, and to the 2.2 kernel. It also introduced Kudzu, a software library for automatic discovery and configuration of hardware.

Version 7 was released in preparation for the 2.4 kernel, although the first release still used the stable 2.2 kernel. Glibc was updated to version 2.1.92, which was a beta of the upcoming version 2.2 and Red Hat used a patched version of GCC from CVS that they called "2.96". The decision to ship an unstable GCC version was due to GCC 2.95's bad performance on non-i386 platforms, especially DEC Alpha. Newer GCCs had also improved support for the C++ standard, which caused much of the existing code not to compile.

In particular, the use of a non-released version of GCC caused some criticism, e.g. from Linus Torvalds and the GCC Steering Committee; Red Hat was forced to defend their decision.
GCC 2.96 failed to compile the Linux kernel, and some other software used in Red Hat, due to stricter checks. It also had an incompatible C++ ABI with other compilers. The distribution included a previous version of GCC for compiling the kernel, called "kgcc".

As of Red Hat Linux 7.0, UTF-8 was enabled as the default character encoding for the system. This had little effect on English-speaking users, but enabled much easier internationalisation and seamless support for multiple languages, including ideographic, bi-directional and complex script languages along with European languages. However, this did cause some negative reactions among existing Western European users, whose legacy ISO-8859–based setups were broken by the change.

Version 8.0 was also the second to include the Bluecurve desktop theme. It used a common theme for GNOME-2 and KDE 3.0.2 desktops, as well as OpenOffice-1.0. KDE members did not appreciate the change, claiming that it was not in the best interests of KDE.

Version 9 supported the Native POSIX Thread Library, which was ported to the 2.4 series kernels by Red Hat.

Red Hat Linux lacked many features due to possible copyright and patent problems. For example, MP3 support was disabled in both Rhythmbox and XMMS; instead, Red Hat recommended using Ogg Vorbis, which has no patents. MP3 support, however, could be installed afterwards, although royalties are required everywhere MP3 is patented. Support for Microsoft's NTFS file system was also missing, but could be freely installed as well.

Fedora Linux

Red Hat Linux was originally developed exclusively inside Red Hat, with the only feedback from users coming through bug reports and contributions to the included software packages – not contributions to the distribution as such. This was changed in late 2003 when Red Hat Linux merged with the community-based Fedora Project. The new plan was to draw most of the codebase from Fedora Linux when creating new Red Hat Enterprise Linux distributions. Fedora Linux replaced the original Red Hat Linux download and retail version. The model is similar to the relationship between Netscape Communicator and Mozilla, or StarOffice and OpenOffice.org, although in this case the resulting commercial product is also fully free software.

Version history

Release dates were drawn from announcements on comp.os.linux.announce. Version names are chosen as to be cognitively related to the prior release, yet not related in the same way as the release before that.

The Fedora and Red Hat Projects were merged on September 22, 2003.

See also

 Fedora Linux release history
 List of Linux distributions

References

External links

Fedora Linux – Free, community-supported, home version of Red Hat Linux
Fedora Project – History of Red Hat Linux
Red Hat, Inc. – Linux documentation
Linux Kernel Organization – Red Hat Archive

Mapping of RedHat Versions and Code Names to LINUX Kernel Versions

Discontinued Linux distributions
Red Hat software
RPM-based Linux distributions
Linux distributions